St Stephen's Church is in the village of Moulton, Cheshire, England. The church is recorded in the National Heritage List for England as a designated Grade II listed building. and is an active Anglican parish church in the diocese of Chester, the archdeaconry of Chester and the deanery of Middlewich.

History

The village developed with the growth of the salt industry in nearby Winsford and it was decided to have a church in the village. The church was designed by John Douglas and the foundation stone was laid in 1876. In 1877 St Stephen's was established as a separate parish and the church was consecrated on 16 January 1877 by Dr William Jacobson, Bishop of Chester.

Architecture and fittings

The church is built in yellow sandstone with red sandstone ashlar dressings and has a green slate roof with a lead spire. Its style is Gothic Revival. The plan of the church consists of a nave and chancel with a north-eastern transept, a south-eastern vestry and a southwest porch. While the exterior is in stone, the interior is built in two kinds of brick. In the church is a plain sedilia. The stained glass in the east window is by J. C. Bewsey. Elsewhere there is a millennium window by R. N. Bradley. The organ was built in 1876 by Henry Bevington and Sons.

External features

The vicarage in Jack Lane was also designed by John Douglas and is listed Grade II.

Present day

Anglican services are held regularly on Sundays, and baptisms, weddings and funerals are performed in the church. Regular children's and youth activities are also organised.

See also

Listed buildings in Moulton, Cheshire
List of new churches by John Douglas

References

Churches completed in 1877
19th-century Church of England church buildings
Church of England church buildings in Cheshire
Grade II listed churches in Cheshire
Gothic Revival church buildings in England
Gothic Revival architecture in Cheshire
John Douglas buildings
Diocese of Chester
1877 establishments in England